Evan Smith may refer to:
 Evan Smith (journalist) (born 1966), American journalist, CEO and editor-in-chief of The Texas Tribune
 Evan Smith (American football) (born 1986), American football center
 Evan Smith (playwright), American playwright
 Evan Smith, a member of the band Malkauns
 Evan Smith, a multi-instrumentalist who performs as a live member with Bleachers